B. J. Young may refer to:

 B. J. Young (ice hockey) (1977–2005), ice hockey right winger
 B. J. Young (basketball) (born 1993), American basketball player